The 1985–86 North Carolina Tar Heels men's basketball team represented the University of North Carolina from Chapel Hill, North Carolina during the 1985–86 NCAA Division I men's basketball season.

Led by head coach Dean Smith, the Tar Heels completed yet another in a long line of impressive seasons, holding the #1 ranking in the AP poll for 13 consecutive weeks, and reaching the Sweet Sixteen in the NCAA tournament before falling to eventual national champion, Louisville.

On January 18, 1986, #1 North Carolina defeated #3 Duke 95–92 in the first game played at the Dean Smith Center.

Roster

Schedule and results

|-
!colspan=9 | Regular Season
|-

|-
!colspan=9 | ACC Tournament
|-

|-
!colspan=9 | NCAA Tournament
|-

Rankings

References

North Carolina Tar Heels men's basketball seasons
Tar
Tar
North Carolina
North Carolina